Bromley South railway station is on the Chatham Main Line in England, serving the town centre and high street of Bromley, south-east London.

The station and most trains that serve the station are operated by Southeastern, with some services also operated by Thameslink. It is in Travelcard Zone 5.

Services

The typical off-peak service in trains per hour is:
 2 tph to  via 
 2 tph to London Blackfriars via 
 2 tph to 
 2 tph to  via 
 1 tph to 
 1 tph to  via 
 1 tph to  via Chatham
 1 tph to  via 

A number of additional services call at the station during the peak hours. These include additional stopping services to London Victoria via Herne Hill, direct Southeastern trains to London Blackfriars as well as additional trains between London and Ashford via Maidstone East.

Layout 
The station has 4 platforms, platform 1 being for stopping services to Central London via Herne Hill or Catford, platform 2 for services to Orpington or Sevenoaks via Swanley, platform 3 for non-stop services to London Victoria and platform 4 for services to Ramsgate and Dover Priory via Chatham or Ashford International services.

Connections
London Buses routes 61, 119, 138, 146, 162, 208, 261, 246, 314, 320, 336, 352, 358 and 367 and night routes N3 and N199 serve the station.

See also 

Bromley North railway station, a smaller station a short walk away

References

External links 

Railway stations in the London Borough of Bromley
Former London, Chatham and Dover Railway stations
Railway stations in Great Britain opened in 1858
Railway stations served by Southeastern
Railway stations served by Govia Thameslink Railway
1858 establishments in England